Boynes is a surname. Notable people with the surname include:

 Robert Boynes (born 1943), Australian artist 
 Winford Boynes (born 1957), American basketball player

See also
 Norbert de Boynes (1870–1954), vicar

English-language surnames